Cantonese Pinyin (also known as ) is a romanization system for Cantonese developed by the Rev. Yu Ping Chiu (余秉昭) in 1971, and subsequently modified by the Education Department (merged into the Education and Manpower Bureau since 2003) of Hong Kong and Prof. Zhan Bohui (詹伯慧) of the Chinese Dialects Research Centre of the Jinan University, Guangdong, PRC, and honorary professor of the School of Chinese, University of Hong Kong. It is the only romanization system accepted by Education and Manpower Bureau of Hong Kong and Hong Kong Examinations and Assessment Authority.

The formal and short forms of the system's Chinese names mean respectively "the Cantonese Pronunciation list of Chinese Characters in Common Use romanization system" and "the romanization system of the Hong Kong Education and Manpower Bureau".

Pinyin 
The Cantonese Pinyin system directly corresponds to the S. L. Wong system, an IPA-based phonemic transcription system used in A Chinese Syllabary Pronounced According to the Dialect of Canton by Wong Shik Ling.  Generally, if an IPA symbol is also an English letter, the same symbol is used directly in the Romanization (with the exception of the IPA symbol "a"); and if the IPA symbol is not an English letter, it is Romanized using English letters. Thus, →aa, →a, →e, →o, →oe, →ng.  This results in a system which is both easy to learn and type but is still useful for academics.

In the following table, the first row inside a cell shows the Cantonese Pinyin, the second row shows a representative "narrow transcription" in IPA, while the third row shows the corresponding IPA "broad transcription" using the S. L. Wong system.

Initials

Finals 

 The finals m and ng can only be used as standalone nasal syllables.

Tones 
The system recognises nine tones in six distinct tone contours.

Comparison with Yale Romanization 
Cantonese Pinyin and the Yale Romanization system represent Cantonese pronunciations with these same letters:
 The initials: b, p, m, f, d, t, n, l, g, k, ng, h, s, gw, kw, w.
 The vowels: aa (except when used alone), a, e, i, o, u.
 The nasal stops: m, ng.
 The codas: i (except for being the coda  in Yale), u, m, n, ng, p, t, k.
But they have these differences:
 The vowel y represents  in Cantonese Pinyin while both yu (used in nucleus) and i (used in coda) are used in Yale.
 The initial j represents  in Cantonese Pinyin while y is used instead in Yale.
 The initial dz represents  in Cantonese Pinyin while j is used instead in Yale.
 The initial ts represents  in Cantonese Pinyin while ch is used instead in Yale.
 In Cantonese Pinyin, if no consonant precedes the vowel y, then the initial j is appended before the vowel. In Yale, the corresponding initial y is never appended before yu under any circumstances.
 Some new finals can be written in Cantonese Pinyin that are not contained in Yale Romanization schemes, such as: eu , em , and ep .  These three finals are used in colloquial Cantonese words, such as deu6 (掉), lem2 (舐), and gep9 (夾).
 To represent tones, only tone numbers are used in Cantonese Pinyin while Yale originally used tone marks together with the letter h (though tone numbers can be used in Yale as well).

Comparison with Jyutping 
Cantonese Pinyin and Jyutping represent Cantonese pronunciations with these same letters:
 The initials: b, p, m, f, d, t, n, l, g, k, ng, h, s, gw, kw, j, w.
 The vowels: aa, a, e, i, o, u.
 The nasal stops: m, ng.
 The codas: i (except for being the coda  in Jyutping), u, m, n, ng, p, t, k.
But they have these differences:
 The vowel y represents  in Cantonese Pinyin while both yu (used in nucleus) and i (used in coda) are used in Jyutping.
 The initial dz represents  in Cantonese Pinyin while z is used instead in Jyutping.
 The initial ts represents  in Cantonese Pinyin while c is used instead in Jyutping.
 To represent tones, numbers 1 to 9 are usually used in Cantonese Pinyin, although to use 1, 3, 6 to replace 7, 8, 9 is acceptable. However, only numbers 1 to 6 are used in Jyutping.

Examples 

An old Chinese poem:

References

Further reading

External links 
Website of Standard Chinese in Hong Kong
an IME software using Cantonese Pinyin

Cantonese romanisation
Languages of Hong Kong
Pinyin